Samuel Judah Löb ben David Kauders (1766 – 6 May 1838) was a Bohemian rabbi.

Biography
Kauders was born in Bechyne, Bohemia, in 1766. At the age of 10 he went to study under Michael Bacharach in Prague, and at the age of 13 became a student of Elazar Fleckeles and a friend of Bezalel Ronsburg. After completing his studies, he devoted his time to Talmudics without holding a rabbinical position.

Between 1824 and 1827 he was also responsible for the Prachin district. In 1834 Kauders succeeded   as Oberjurist (acting chief rabbi) of Prague, a position which he held until his death. 

While a Talmudist of the old school and rigorously Orthodox, he was tolerant in his views and favored secular education.

Publications
  Responsa on Shulḥan Arukh, Oraḥ Ḥayyim, of which the first part only, containing 112 responsa, was published.
  Halakhic essays in two parts.
  Homilies and essays.

References
 

1766 births
1838 deaths
19th-century Czech rabbis
Czech Orthodox rabbis
People from Bechyně
Rabbis from Prague
Rabbis of Prague